is a Japanese television series that debuted on July 16, 2011.

See also
 Sphere (Japanese band)

References

External links
 Official website 

2011 Japanese television series debuts
Japanese variety television shows
Nippon TV original programming